Andarud-e Sofla (also Romanized as Andarud-e Soflá, Andarūd Soflā, and Andrūd-e Soflá; also known as Andarud and Andarūd-e Pā’īn) is a village in Kaghazkonan-e Markazi Rural District, Kaghazkonan District, Meyaneh County, East Azerbaijan Province, Iran. At the 2006 census, its population was 91, in 31 families.

References 

Populated places in Meyaneh County